Stranglers in the Night is the eleventh studio album by the Stranglers and the first release on the band's own record label, Psycho, in 1992. 

It opened the recording career of the Stranglers MK II, with Paul Roberts on vocals and John Ellis on guitar. The band returned to a purer, less "produced" sound; the horns have departed and the songs have a less-constrained, harder edge. Styles vary from ballads such as "Southern Mountains" and "Grand Canyon" to the fast-paced "Sugar Bullets" and "Brainbox". The album marks the second Stranglers album to be produced by Mike Kemp, the first being 1986's Dreamtime.

The North American version of this album (with a white, rather than dark grey, cover) contained three extra tracks ("Coffee Shop", "Vicious Circles" and "So Uncool"), which were originally B-sides in the UK.  The album peaked at No. 33 in the UK Albums Chart in September 1992. The single "Heaven or Hell" was released from the album, and peaked at No. 46 in the UK Singles Chart in August 1992. The follow-up single, "Sugar Bullets", failed to chart.

Track listing

Personnel
 The Stranglers

 Paul Roberts – vocals
 Jean-Jacques Burnel – bass, vocals
 John Ellis – guitar, vocals
 Dave Greenfield – keyboards, vocals
 Jet Black – drums, percussion

 Additional musicians 
 Simon Morton – additional percussion

 Technical
 Mike Kemp – production
 The Stranglers – production on "Coffee Shop" and "Vicious Circles"
 Richard Norris – engineering 
 Jill Furmanovsky – photography
 Cactus – sleeve design
 Simon J. Webb – Psycho Records logo design

References

The Stranglers albums
1992 albums